Horsell is a village in the borough of Woking in Surrey, England, less than a mile north-west of Woking town centre. In November 2012, its population was 9,384. Horsell is integral to H. G. Wells' classic science fiction novel The War of the Worlds, the sand pits of Horsell Common being the site of the first Martian landing. Horsell Common has since been designated a Site of Special Scientific Interest. Another landmark is the McLaren Technology Centre, built on the northern edge of the common in the early 2000s for the McLaren Group.

History
Horsell was first documented in the 13th century, although the parish church of St Mary the Virgin is believed to date from the middle of the 12th century. The name probably comes from the Anglo-Saxon horig scylf, meaning "muddy slope". This may refer to the hill known as Horsell Rise now carrying the metalled track.

Until the late 19th century, the village consisted of scattered cottages and farms, surrounded by fields, heathlands and nurseries. Suburban development began in the 1880s, but the village remains largely rural in character.

Terrain
Horsell is located in northern Surrey and is surrounded by deciduous woodland.

Some geographic locations in Horsell are;
Church Hill
Horsell Rise 
Horsell Common
The sandpit
ex-Norman Lake

Horsell Common
One of Horsell's significant locations is Horsell Common, where H. G. Wells set the landing of the Martians in his novel War of the Worlds. The common includes an ancient Indian burial ground a bomb crater from World War II, a large, seasonal pond with a sandpit, and an open field extending to the grounds of the McLaren headquarters. It hosts a wide variety of plant and wildlife species and has the status of a Site of Special Scientific Interest. The World War II Home Guard base on the common has disappeared. Several smaller institutions were evacuated here during the war.

Schools and facilities
The Anglican parish church of St Mary the Virgin dates back to the middle of the 12th century, and still retains the original doors. The church has strong links with one of the village's junior schools, Horsell C of E Junior School. The village's other schools include the Horsell Village School, built 1851, and independent school St. Andrew's School along with Woking High School, formerly Horsell High School.

It is also the home of Woking and Horsell Cricket Club, whose members have included Alec and Eric Bedser. The famous twins played cricket for Surrey; Alec also played with great success for England.

Notable people
In birth order:
Norman Pares (1857–1936), Vicar of Horsell from 1897 to 1936, had been a member of the Old Etonians team that won the 1879 FA Cup Final.
Ursula Bethell (1874–1945), a New Zealand poet, was born in Horsell.
Lewis Leigh Fermor (1880–1954), chemist/biologist father of travel writer Patrick Leigh Fermor, died in Horsell.
Alec (1918–2010) and Eric Bedser (1918–2006), first-class cricketers, spent some of their childhood in Horsell.

Gallery

See also
History of Woking
List of places of worship in Woking (borough)

References

External links

Pictures of the Martian invasion memorial statues
Information about Horsell from Horsell Residents' Association

Villages in Surrey
Woking